Angélique des Méloizes (December 11, 1722- December 1, 1792) was a Canadian socialite, and the politically influential mistress of François Bigot, Intendant of New France 1748-1760. She was the centre of high society in Quebec City.

The daughter of Nicolas-Marie Renaud d'Avène des Méloizes and Françoise-Thérèse Dupont de Neuville, she was born in Quebec City. Des Méloizes was married to the adjutant of that city,  Michel-Jean-Hugues Péan. She is known for her love affair with François Bigot, Intendant of New France 1748-1760, and for the influence over politics attributed to her during his tenure, for which she has been compared to Madame de Pompadour. Alongside Péan, Bigot and Joseph-Michel Cadet, she was accused in France of having contributed to France's loss of Canada to Britain in 1760, during the Seven Years' War.

In their later years, the couple lived at Orzain near Blois in France. She died at Blois several days before her 70th birthday.

References 
 Juliette Rémillard, “RENAUD D’AVÈNE DES MÉLOIZES, ANGÉLIQUE,” in Dictionary of Canadian Biography, vol. 4, University of Toronto/Université Laval, 2003–, accessed June 15, 2016,

People of New France
1722 births
1792 deaths
18th-century Canadian women
Canadian socialites